Guillermo Robson (15 June 1904 – 6 November 1972) was an Argentine tennis player. He competed in the men's singles and doubles events at the 1924 Summer Olympics.

References

External links
 

1904 births
1972 deaths
Argentine male tennis players
Olympic tennis players of Argentina
Tennis players at the 1924 Summer Olympics
Tennis players from Buenos Aires